Sir Jean Lomer Gouin,  (March 19, 1861 – March 28, 1929) was a Canadian politician. He served as 13th premier of Quebec, as a Cabinet minister in the federal government of Canada, and as the 15th lieutenant governor of Quebec.

Biography

He was born in Grondines, Quebec to Dr. Joseph-Nérée Gouin, a doctor and Séraphine Fugère. On May 24, 1888, he married Éliza Mercier, daughter of Honoré Mercier. Their son, Paul Gouin, later led the Action libérale nationale party.

He was first elected to the Legislative Assembly of Quebec in 1897 in Montréal division no. 2, and was re-elected in 1900 and 1904. In the 1908 election he ran in both Portneuf and Montréal no. 2, and was elected in the former and defeated in the latter. In 1912 he won election in both Portneuf and Saint-Jean; he elected to resign the Saint-Jean seat. He was re-elected in Portneuf in 1916 and 1919.

In 1920, he was named to the Legislative Council of Quebec but resigned in 1921 without ever having taken his seat, and moved to federal politics.

In the federal election of 1921, he was elected as a Liberal member of Parliament, and served as Justice Minister under prime minister William Lyon Mackenzie King until 1924.

He was subsequently named Lieutenant Governor of Quebec in 1929, but served only two months until his death in Quebec City.

Lomer Gouin is interred in the Notre Dame des Neiges Cemetery in Montreal.

Elections as party leader

He won the 1908 election, 1912 election, 1916 election and 1919 election and resigned in 1920.

Honours
Many sites and landmarks were named to honour Lomer Gouin. They include:

 Gouin Boulevard, the longest street on the Island of Montreal;
 Gouin Reservoir (In French: Réservoir Gouin), a man-made collection of lakes in the center of the province of Quebec;
 Rue Gouin (Gouin Street) and Place Gouin, located in Shawinigan, Quebec, Canada;
 Rue Gouin (Gouin Street), located in Gatineau, Quebec, Canada;
 The provincial district of Gouin;
 Lomer-Gouin, intra-provincial ferry services between Levis to Quebec City operate by Société des traversiers du Québec.

See also
Politics of Quebec
List of Quebec general elections
Timeline of Quebec history

External links

 

Lomer Gouin fonds, Library and Archives Canada.

1861 births
1929 deaths
Lawyers in Quebec
Liberal Party of Canada MPs
Members of the House of Commons of Canada from Quebec
Quebec Liberal Party MLCs
Canadian Knights Bachelor
Canadian Knights Commander of the Order of St Michael and St George
Lieutenant Governors of Quebec
Members of the King's Privy Council for Canada
Premiers of Quebec
Quebec Liberal Party MNAs
Quebec political party leaders
Attorneys General of Canada
Université de Montréal alumni
Burials at Notre Dame des Neiges Cemetery